Vladimir Marković may refer to:

 Vladimir Markovic (born 1973), mathematician
 Vlado Marković, Vladimir "Vlado" Marković (born 1985), football player